Myyrä (English: The Mole) is Finnish reality television show based on Belgian reality show De Mol. The show is hosted by Roope Salminen, and first aired in 2019 on MTV3.

Format
The format is pretty much same as on the original version:

Each episode contestants (VIPs or NIPs) complete two tasks, where can be earned or lost money and secret Immunity or Joker- symbols. These tasks can be either group or personal tasks. However, there's one person, who's trying to sabotage these tasks, and trying to keep the winning pot small as possible. One of the group is holding the money on the wallet and make sure, that they are safe. After all the tasks of the day are done, the voting starts: each player will answer to 20 questions based on the tasks of the day, of just to the mole itself. When all of the contestants have voted, the right answers are counted, and the person, whoe gets less correct answers. will be eliminated. If contestant have founded an Immunity or Joker- symbol during the tasks, he/she can use it on the voting. Immunity means that the contestant has not to complete the quiz. Joker means, that one of the contestants' wrong answer is turned to right answer.

In the final episode, one of the contestants wins the sum that the whole team was able to get previously, and one is revealed as The Mole, who goes home empty handed.

Season overview

Contestants

Season 1

Season 2
In this Season, contestants are celebrities.

Episodes

Season 1 (2019)

Season 2 (2021)

References

The Mole (franchise)
Television shows filmed in Mexico
Television shows filmed in Latvia